Rig Jub (also Romanized as Rīg Jūb and Rīgjūb) is a village in Agahan Rural District, Kolyai District, Sonqor County, Kermanshah Province, Iran. At the 2006 census, its population was 87, in 20 families.

References 

Populated places in Sonqor County